Kubi (also known as Kuba, Kubawa) is an extinct Afro-Asiatic language formerly spoken in Bauchi State, Nigeria. Members of the ethnic group now speak Hausa.

Kubi is a village that known as member of za'ar tribe and also speaks the same language.

Notes 

West Chadic languages
Languages of Nigeria
Extinct languages of Africa